Impeach My Bush is the fourth studio album by Canadian singer Peaches, released on July 7, 2006 by XL Recordings. The album includes guest appearances by Joan Jett, Beth Ditto, Josh Homme, Samantha Maloney, Mocky and her one-time roommate Feist.

Writing and development
Early sessions of Impeach My Bush were recorded at Peaches' Berlin studio with Eagles of Death Metal singer Jesse "The Devil" Hughes. She finished recording the album with producers Mickey Petralia and Greg Kurstin at Jeff Porcaro's (Toto) self-built studio in Los Angeles.

Composition
The album draws from glam rock, punk, and electro. Lyrically, Impeach My Bush continues the explicit references, double entendres, and gender politics of Peaches' two previous albums. "Two Guys (For Every Girl)" deals with threesomes while "Rock the Shocker" centers on foreplay. "Stick It to the Pimp" is a backlash against hip hop chauvinism.

Promotion

Peaches formed the Herms (short for hermaphrodites) in early 2006 as her live backing band. Herms members included Samantha Maloney (Hole), JD Samson (Le Tigre), and Radio Sloan. "Herms" is a reference to the 1970s duo Peaches & Herb and blending of words her and him. Peaches and Herms were the opening act for Nine Inch Nails and Bauhaus during the second half of their 2006 summer US tour. Peaches and Herms also toured as part of the Australian festival Big Day Out and the 2007 Coachella Valley Music and Arts Festival.

"Do Ya" was used in the Gap clothing commercials for the fall 2006 season. "Do Ya" also appeared in the 2006 horror film All the Boys Love Mandy Lane. In addition, "You Love It" was played at the ending of the CSI: NY season three episode "Oedipus Hex" on October 18, 2006, and "Tent in Your Pants" was used in the 2007 comedy film Young People Fucking. On April 13, 2007, Peaches appeared on the season two premiere of The Henry Rollins Show, where she performed the song "Hit It Hard".

Peaches directed a music video for "Get It", which debuted on May 7, 2008 as part of the third season of SHOWstudio.com's series of fashion films titled Political Fashion, which was developed by British director Nick Knight. In 2013, the song "Downtown" was used in a commercial to promote Downtown Milwaukee, Wisconsin.

Singles
"Downtown" was released as the album's lead single on July 3, 2006. It received positive reviews for its disco sound and sexual lyrics. The single peaked at number 50 on the UK Singles Chart. "Boys Wanna Be Her" was released as the second and final single on November 6, 2006.

Critical reception

Impeach My Bush received generally favorable reviews from music critics. At Metacritic, which assigns a weighted mean rating out of 100 to reviews from mainstream critics, the album received an average score of 74, based on 22 reviews, which indicates "generally favorable reviews". Heather Phares of AllMusic said, "Even if it's not as traffic-stopping as her debut, this album suggests that she can keep her music interesting for the long haul. Likewise, Tony Naylor of the NME commented that the album "is no great sonic leap forward, but it is a near-perfect distillation of Peaches' 'thing'." Conversely, Dan Marton of The Observer opined, "After three albums, though, Nisker has pushed the sexual warrior princess routine as far as it can go."

Impeach My Bush ranked at number 36 on eMusic's Best Albums of 2006 list. The album earned Peaches a nomination for Outstanding Music Artist at the 18th GLAAD Media Awards.

Commercial performance
Impeach My Bush spent one week on the US Billboard 200 at number 168, selling 5,000 copies its first week.

Track listing

Personnel
Credits adapted from the liner notes of Impeach My Bush.

 Peaches – vocals, production; guitar ; beat programming, keyboards ; lead guitar, rhythm guitar ; dancers photo
 "Darlin" Dave Catching – guitar 
 Jerry DiRienzo – EBow guitar, guitar 
 Beth Ditto – chorus vocals 
 Feist – backing vocals 
 Josh Homme – guitar 
 Janager – finger snaps, handclaps 
 Joan Jett – guitar, vocals 

 Greg Kurstin – beat programming ; keyboards ; production 
 Samantha Maloney – drums 
 Mocky – backup moans 
 Brian "Big Hands" O'Connor – bass 
 Micky Petralia – mixing, production ; live drums ; beat programming ; drums 
 Tyler Shields – cover, poster
 Jacques Wait – studio photos

Charts

Release history

References

2006 albums
Albums produced by Greg Kurstin
Albums produced by Mickey Petralia
Peaches (musician) albums
XL Recordings albums